Al-Arabi is a professional football club that is based in the city of Umm Al Quwain. They play in the first Division of the UAE Football League.  They were coached by Goran Miscevic.

Current squad 

As of UAE Division One:

References

Al-Arabi SC (UAE)
Arabi
Association football clubs established in 1972
1972 establishments in the United Arab Emirates